Gustav Pick (10 December 1832– 20 April 1921) was a musician and composer of Wienerlieder (Viennese songs).. 

He was born and brought up in the Jewish village of Rechnitz, where his father was a merchant. In 1845 the family moved to Vienna. Whilst working as a bank clerk, Pick took piano lessons and began to compose.
 
He created one of the most popular Wienerlieder, the "Fiakerlied". It was made a success by the famous actor Alexander Girardi.

Pick is buried in the  Wiener Zentralfriedhof.

External links 
 Composer: Gustav Pick on ArkivMusic

1832 births
1921 deaths
People from Oberwart District
Austrian Jews
Jewish songwriters
Wienerlied
Burials at the Vienna Central Cemetery